The M class, more properly known as the Admiralty M class, were a class of 85 destroyers built for the Royal Navy of United Kingdom that saw service during World War I. All ships were built to an identical – Admiralty – design, hence the class name. 18 other vessels which were officially included within the 'M' class were built to variant designs by three specialist builders – 10 by Yarrow, 6 by Thornycroft (who also built another 6 to the standard Admiralty design), and 2 by Hawthorn Leslie; these are covered in other articles.

All ships built to the Admiralty design had three identical narrow, circular funnels (this did not apply to the 18 ships built by the specialist yards).

Ships of the pre-war (1913–14) Programme
Six vessels were built under the 1913–14 Naval Programme. These differed from the wartime vessels by being 1,010 tons full load, with slightly smaller dimensions.

Besides the above six vessels, three destroyers already under construction were purchased from Yarrow, two from Thornycroft and two from Hawthorn Leslie to these builders' individual designs, and these are listed in separate articles. Three further ships had been projected under the 1913–14 Naval Programme – and named Marksman, Menace and Monitor; however these three ships were cancelled before being contracted to any specific builder, in favour of two Marksman-class leaders.

Ships of the Emergency War Construction Programme
All the following vessels were ordered in five batches as part of the War Emergency Programme. Wartime builds omitted the cruising turbines originally specified and carried by the pre-war sub-group. The funnel heights were also raised compared with the pre-war vessels, and the second 4 in gun was mounted on a bandstand, as with the earlier L-class destroyers. Partridge, Norman, Maenad, Ophelia and Observer were later fitted to carry a kite balloon.

1st War Programme
Sixteen vessels were ordered in September 1914 (as well as four of the Yarrow M class), but part of their cost was met by the provision in the 1914–15 Programme for ten destroyers.

2nd War Programme
Nine further vessels were ordered in early November 1914 (as well as one further Yarrow M class).

3rd War Programme
Twenty-two further vessels were ordered in late November 1914.

4th War Programme
Sixteen further vessels were ordered in February 1915 (as well as two more of the Thornycroft M class). The eight last-named below of these were of the Repeat M subgroup with raking stems compared with the straight stems of the previous sub-group, and the bows were more flared to improve seakeeping qualities.

5th War Programme
Eighteen final vessels were ordered in May 1915 (as well as two of the Thornycroft M class and two of the Yarrow M class). However, two of the eighteen were fitted with geared turbines and became the prototypes for the Admiralty R class destroyers (these were the Radstock and Raider, and are listed with the R class). The other sixteen were all to the Admiralty design were of the Repeat M subgroup with raking stems apart from the two ships ordered from White as Redmill and Redwing, which were completed to the earlier 'M' Class design and were renamed Medina and Medway while building.

Notes

Bibliography

 
 Destroyers of the Royal Navy, 1893–1981, Maurice Cocker, 1983, Ian Allan 
 Jane's Fighting Ships, 1919, Jane's Publishing.
 British Warships 1914–1919, Fred Dittmar & Jim Colledge, 1972, Ian Allan SBN 7110 0380 7.

 
M class destroyer Admiralty
Ship classes of the Royal Navy